The 2008 Critérium du Dauphiné Libéré was the 60th edition of the Critérium du Dauphiné Libéré cycle race and was held from 8 June to 15 June 2005. The race started in Le Pontet and finished in Grenoble. The race was won by Spanish rider Alejandro Valverde of the  team.

Teams
Eighteen UCI ProTour teams, each containing a maximum of eight riders, participated in the 2008 Critérium du Dauphiné Libéré:

Route

Stages

Prologue
8 June 2008 – Le Pontet to Avignon,  (ITT)

Stage 1
9 June 2008 – Avignon to Privas,

Stage 2
10 June 2008 – Bourg-Saint-Andéol to Vienne, }

Stage 3
11 June 2008 – Saint-Paul-en-Jarez to Saint-Paul-en-Jarez,  (ITT)

Stage 4
12 June 2008 – Vienne to Annemasse,

Stage 5
13 June 2008 – Ville-la-Grand to Morzine,

Stage 6
14 June 2008 – Morzine to La Toussuire,

Stage 7
15 June 2008 – Saint-Jean-de-Maurienne to Grenoble,

General Classification

Jersey progress

Jersey wearers when one rider is leading two or more competitions
 In stage 1, Thor Hushovd wore the green jersey
 In stage 3, Alejandro Valverde wore the green jersey
 In stages 4–7, Levi Leipheimer wore the green jersey

ProTour standings
As of 15 June 2008, after the 2008 Critérium du Dauphiné Libéré.

 91 riders have scored at least one point on the 2008 UCI ProTour.

See also
2008 in road cycling

References

Further reading

External links
 

2008 in French sport
2008 UCI ProTour
2008
June 2008 sports events in Europe